Jakub Wawrzyniak (born 7 July 1983) is a Polish former footballer. He usually played as a left-back or center-back. Earlier in his career, he also appeared a few times as a striker and as a midfielder.

Club career
Wawrzyniak played for Legia Warsaw from fall 2007 to the end of 2008.

On 4 June 2009 the Disciplinary Committee of the Greek Superliga suspended him for three months on doping charges. His suspension was later extended to one year. Panathinaikos announced they would not take up their buy option on the player, thus leaving Wawrzyniak to return to Legia Warsaw. The substance in question is not prohibited by the World Anti-Doping Agency. Wawrzyniak appealed to the Court of Arbitration for Sport in Lausanne. In December 2009 the court shortened his suspension to the original three months. The player intends to pursue compensation from the Greek association.

On 26 February 2014 he joined Russian Premier League club Amkar Perm.

On 5 January 2015 he joined Lechia Gdańsk.

International career
Wawrzyniak made his debut for the Poland national football team in the game versus UAE on 6 December 2006 in Abu Zabi. He currently has 49 caps to his name.

Career statistics

Club

1 Including Ekstraklasa Cup and Polish SuperCup.

International

International goals

Successes

2x Ekstraklasa Winner (2013, 2014) with Legia Warsaw

4x Polish Cup Winner (2008, 2011, 2012, 2013) with Legia Warsaw

1x Polish SuperCup Winner (2008) with Legia Warsaw

References

External links

 Player stats at Guardian.co.uk 
 
 National team stats on the website of the Polish Football Association 
 

1983 births
Living people
Polish footballers
Polish expatriate footballers
Sparta Brodnica players
Widzew Łódź players
Legia Warsaw players
Panathinaikos F.C. players
FC Amkar Perm players
Lechia Gdańsk players
GKS Katowice players
Poland international footballers
UEFA Euro 2008 players
UEFA Euro 2012 players
People from Kutno
Ekstraklasa players
Russian Premier League players
Super League Greece players
Expatriate footballers in Greece
Expatriate footballers in Russia
Sportspeople from Łódź Voivodeship
UEFA Euro 2016 players
Association football defenders